The Sri Lanka national cricket team represents Sri Lanka in international cricket and is a full member of the International Cricket Council (ICC) with Test and One Day International (ODI) status. Sri Lanka first competed in international cricket in 1975, when they played against West Indies during 1975 Cricket World Cup; West Indies won the match by 9 wickets at Old Trafford, Manchester, England.

After Sri Lanka awarded Test status on 17 February 1982 as eighth Test playing nation, they had to wait until 6 September 1985, where Sri Lanka recorded their first Test win by beating India, in the second match of the series by 149 runs at the P Sara Oval, Colombo. As of 27 July 2019, Sri Lanka have played 283 Test matches; they have won 90 matches, lost 107 matches, and 85 matches were drawn. They have also won the 2001-02 Asian Test Championship, defeating Pakistan in the final by an innings and 175 runs.

Sri Lanka registered their first ODI win against India at Manchester, England, on 16 June 1979. As of 29 July 2019, Sri Lanka have played 846 ODI matches, winning 385 matches and losing 419; they also tied 5 matches, whilst 37 had no result. They also won the 1996 Cricket World Cup, co-champions in 2002 ICC Champions Trophy and also became five times Asian champions in 1986, 1997, 2004, 2008 and 2014.

Sri Lanka played their first Twenty20 International (T20I) match at the Rose Bowl, on 15 June 2006, against England, winning the match by 2 runs. In 2014, they won the 2014 ICC World Twenty20, defeating India by 6 wickets. As of July 2019, Sri Lanka have played 114 T20I matches and won 55 of them; 56 were lost and 2 tied and 1 no result match as well. They have won the 2014 ICC World Twenty20 championship in Bangladesh and was runner-up in two previous occasions. (2009, 2012).

As of July 2019, Sri Lanka have faced major nine teams in Test cricket instead of Ireland and Afghanistan, with their most frequent opponent being Pakistan, playing 53 matches against them. Sri Lanka have registered more wins against Pakistan and Bangladesh than any other team, with 16. In ODI matches, Sri Lanka have played against 17 teams; they have played against India most frequently, with a winning percentage of 38.17 in 159 matches. Within usual major ODI nations, Sri Lanka have defeated Pakistan on 58 occasions, which is their best record in ODIs. The team have competed against 15 countries in T20Is, and have played 18 matches against Pakistan. Sri Lanka have defeated Australia 8 occasions, which is their best win record against opponents. Sri Lanka was the best T20I team in the world, where they ranked number one in more than 32 months, and reached World Twenty20 final in three times.

Key

Test cricket

Statistics are correct as of 26 March 2021

One Day International

Statistics are correct as of 1 March 2020

Twenty20 International

Statistics are correct as of 26 June 2021

Notes

References

Cricket records and statistics
Sri Lanka in international cricket